Dave Lloyd (born 12 October 1949), is an English former professional cyclist.

Life
Lloyd began racing in 1969. In 1972 he came seventh in the Milk Race before going on to win the William Tell GP, beating Francesco Moser and Freddy Maertens, and riding in the Munich Olympics. In 1973 he turned professional with Raleigh, and over the next three years he won the national 5000m pursuit championship twice and set a national 50-mile road record. In 1976 a heart condition forced a three-year break from cycling. On recovery he restarted as an amateur and over six years won 125 of 133 races. In 1982 he won the Points, King of the Mountains and Overall in the Girvan 3-Day beating a strong field of riders that included Paul Curran, Joey McLoughlin and Jeff Williams. In 1984 he returned to the professional sport, and finally retired from cycling two years later.

Lloyd was a framebuilder for 13 years. Living in south Wirral, he is now a cycling coach and is behind The Dave Lloyd Mega Challenge.  In September 2009 he planned to return to amateur road racing by entering the Derby Mercury road race. Unfortunately one of his athletes had also entered the race, and Lloyd decided not to compete against him.

Palmarès 

1972
 1st Overall William Tell GP
 3rd Stage 6 Milk Race, New Brighton
 2nd in Stage 9 part b Milk Race, Scarborough
 DNF Olympic Games, Road race
 14th Olympic Games, Team Time Trial (100km)
1973
 3rd Cryers Hill
 1st Eckington
 1st Felixstowe
 2nd Haverhill
 2nd Leek
 3rd Nantwick
 3rd Trofeo Baracchi
1974
 2nd Bridlington
 1st Caerphilly
 3rd Durham
 2nd Felixstowe
 2nd Netherseal
 1st Oxton
 1st Southport
 3rd Tom Simpson Memorial
1975
 2nd Buggenhout
1978
 3rd Currasong
1983
 1st General Classification Girvan Three Day
1984
 1st General Classification Tour of Ulster
1986
 2nd General Classification Ron Kitching Classic
 2nd Stage 1 Ron Kitching Classic

References

External links

Dave Lloyd Mega Challenge Official Website

1949 births
Living people
English male cyclists
Olympic cyclists of Great Britain
English cycling coaches
Cyclists at the 1972 Summer Olympics
Sportspeople from Oswestry